Time After Time may refer to:

Film and television
 Time After Time (1979 film), an American film based on the Karl Alexander novel (see below)
 Time After Time (1986 film), a British-Australian television film based on the Molly Keane novel (see below)
 Time After Time, a 2011 TV movie featuring Richard Thomas
 Time After Time (2018 film) or Time Freak, an American film by Andrew Bowler
 Time After Time (TV series), a 2017 American television series based on the Karl Alexander novel (see below)
 Time After Time, a 1994–1995 UK sitcom starring Brian Conley

Television episodes
 "Time After Time" (Brothers and Sisters)
 "Time After Time" (Grey's Anatomy)
 "Time After Time!" (Pokémon Journeys: The Series)
 "Time After Time" (The Wire)
 "Time After Time" (Xiaolin Showdown)

Literature
 Time After Time (Alexander novel), a 1979 science fiction novel involving H. G. Wells by Karl Alexander
 Time After Time (Appel novel), a 1985 time travel novel by Allen Appel
 Time After Time, a 1983 novel by Molly Keane
 Time After Time, a 2019 novel by Lisa Grunwald

Music

Albums
 Time After Time (Etta James album), 1995
 Time After Time (Eva Cassidy album), 2000
 Time After Time (Oscar Peterson album), 1986
 Time After Time (Timmy T album), 1990
 Time After Time, by Crumbächer, 1992
 Time After Time, by Jake Mathews, 2004

Songs
 "Time After Time" (1947 song), a jazz standard by Sammy Cahn and Jule Styne
 "Time After Time" (Angel song), 2012
 "Time After Time" (Cyndi Lauper song), 1984
 "Time After Time" (Elliot Minor song), 2008
 "Time After Time (Hana Mau Machi de)", by Mai Kuraki, 2003
 "Time After Time", by the Beloved from Happiness, 1990
 "Time After Time", by Electric Light Orchestra from Secret Messages, 1983
 "Time After Time", by Estelle from True Romance, 2015
 "Time After Time", by Ozzy Osbourne from No More Tears, 1991
 "Time After Time", by R.E.M. from Reckoning, 1984
 "Time After Time", by Toni Basil from Word of Mouth, 1981